"Beautiful" is a song recorded by American singer Christina Aguilera for her fourth studio album, Stripped (2002). It was released as the album's second single on November 16, 2002. A pop and R&B ballad, "Beautiful" was written and produced by Linda Perry and discusses inner-beauty, as well as self-esteem and insecurity. Aguilera commented that she put "her heart and soul" into the track, which she felt represented the theme of Stripped.

"Beautiful" received universal acclaim from music critics, who have ranked it among Aguilera's strongest material. It won the Grammy Award for Best Female Pop Vocal Performance and was also nominated for Song of the Year at the 2004 ceremony. "Beautiful" was also a commercial success, topping the charts in Australia, Canada, Ireland, New Zealand, Romania, and the United Kingdom. The song peaked at number two on the Billboard Hot 100 in the United States, where it was certified double platinum for over 2 million units sold.

"Beautiful" has been widely embraced as an anthem by the LGBT community for its message of self-empowerment and inner-beauty. An accompanying music video was directed by Jonas Åkerlund, and earned Aguilera a GLAAD Media Award for its positive portrayal of gay and transgender people. In 2011, UK LGBT rights organization Stonewall named "Beautiful" the most empowering song of the previous decade for gay, lesbian, and bisexual people. In 2009, Rolling Stone and VH1 listed it as one of the best songs of the 2000s. The song was later re-recorded in an electronic style, entitled "You Are What You Are (Beautiful)", for her first greatest hits album Keeps Gettin' Better: A Decade of Hits (2008).

Background and recording
"Beautiful" was written and produced by Linda Perry. Christina Aguilera recorded the song at two studios: The Enterprise Studios in Burbank, California, and Conway Recording Studios in Hollywood. Prior to the collaboration with Aguilera, Perry had written the song and wanted to keep the "personal" record for her own singing career. Perry previewed the song for Pink during recording sessions for the latter's sophomore studio album Missundaztood (2001), on which Perry worked as a producer. However, after hearing Aguilera sing the song at Perry's house to "break the ice", Perry was very impressed and allowed Aguilera to include the track on her then-upcoming album Stripped, effectively deciding not to pursue a solo career. The choice resulted in a feud between Pink against Aguilera and Perry, with the former stating that it was "annoying" for the latter to collaborate with artists "[she] didn't like".

Perry later revealed to ASCAP, "When Christina came over to my house to start working, she asked me to play some songs to break the ice. [...] I had a long conversation with my manager about it. We both decided to hear Christina sing it. We demoed the song with her singing it, and I was like, 'Wow'. That rough vocal is what is out there on radio. It was that vocal that got her the song". Perry's then-wife Sara Gilbert confirmed on her show The Talk that the final version was "just a demo." Gilbert also revealed that Aguilera wanted to re-record the song because she did not like the initial vocals. Perry denied the request because the song is supposed to be about imperfection and being vulnerable. Perry said as Aguilera stepped in the booth to record, she said to her friend, "Don't look at me" – which Perry left at the start of the final track. She told Rolling Stone: "I knew I was going to keep that on the record, and I knew she was the right person for the song. I realized, 'Oh, she's insecure. She's one of those beautiful people who's got everything but is super insecure. Okay, this song is hers.'"

Composition and lyrics

"Beautiful" is a pop and R&B ballad that discusses issues of self-esteem and insecurity, promoting a message of self-empowerment and embracing inner beauty. Larry Flick of Billboard added that the song talks about "overcoming life's trials", Chuck Taylor also of Billboard observed that it has a message of "holding oneself up against criticism from the outside," and Todd Burns of Stylus noted that the song "also explores the main theme of the record, being stripped bare in front of the public." Its instrumentation incorporates bass guitar, cello, drum kits, keyboards, piano, and violin. "Beautiful" is composed in the key of E  major and moving at a slow 76 beats per minute. Aguilera's vocal range spans over two octaves from the low note of E3 to the high note of G5; she uses several melismas in the song, fitting as many as seven notes in one syllable.

Release
"Beautiful" was released as the second single from Stripped. It was first sent to American contemporary hit and rhythmic radio stations on November 16, 2002. The song was later released as a CD single on January 27, February 10, February 24, and February 25, 2003, in Germany, Australia, the United Kingdom, and France, respectively. Also on February 25, a digital remix EP of "Beautiful" was released worldwide. Two days later, the single was released as a maxi single in Canada. On March 11, 2003, the single was released as a CD in the United States.

Critical reception

"Beautiful" received universal acclaim from music critics. Stephen Thomas Erlewine of AllMusic commended the song for not following the "club and street-level R&B, which fit her poorly". Similarly, a reviewer from Billboard described "Beautiful" as a "single-worthy ballad" from a record of "pleasantly surprising depth". In a separate review, Chuck Taylor from the same magazine deemed the song "breathtaking", and highlighted its melody and lyrical message. Entertainment Weeklys David Browne called the song one of Strippeds "moments", noting that it is "more restrained" than the other songs from the album. Sal Cinquemani of Slant Magazine commented that the collaboration with Linda Perry found Aguilera "truly naked" and reflective of the album's title. Stylus Magazines Todd Burns gave Stripped a negative review, but complimented "Beautiful" for "tastefully [reining] in Aguilera's frequent vocal acrobatics". Jane Dark of The Village Voice compared the song to the works of Mariah Carey "made back when she was a natural", and the Attitude magazine called it "universal". The Advocates Larry Flick named "Beautiful" a "Beatlesque ballad" and the "great queer anthem of 2003". He also listed it as one of the best songs of the year. In contrast, Amanda Murray from Sputnikmusic criticized the "platitude-drenched" lyrics but praised the overall production. At the 2004 Grammy Awards, "Beautiful" won the award for Best Female Pop Vocal Performance and was nominated for Song of the Year.

"Beautiful" is considered to be Aguilera's signature song and has been recognized as being among the strongest tracks in her catalog. The song was ranked as her third-best single by Rachel McRady of Wetpaint, who commented that "[Aguilera]'s inspiration ballad motivated an entire generation". PopCrush's Alexandra Capotorto named it as her favorite track by Aguilera, opining that the song is "definitely one of the most memorable and greatest Christina Aguilera songs to date". Rolling Stone ranked "Beautiful" at number 52 on their list of the 100 best songs of the 2000s, stating that it is "delivered with full-fathom force by the bottle-blond with the biggest voice". Similarly, VH1 positioned the track at number 18 on their list of the 100 greatest songs of the past decade. It is listed as one of the 100 best pop songs of all time by About.com.

Chart performance
"Beautiful" was quickly released after the underperformance of the album's first single, "Dirrty" in the United States. It achieved international success and was the highest-charting single from Stripped in several territories. The song peaked at number two on the US Billboard Hot 100 for one week, becoming Aguilera's longest-charting solo track, spending 27 weeks on the chart. The song additionally topped Billboard Adult Contemporary, Hot Dance Club Songs, and Pop Songs component charts. In October 2022, it was certified double platinum by the Recording Industry Association of America (RIAA) for shipments of 2,000,000 copies. , the single has sold 1,512,000 digital copies in that country. In Canada, the song peaked at number one on the Billboard Canadian Hot 100. In 2022, the song was certified 2x platinum by the RIAA for sale in excess of 2 million units.
Similarly, "Beautiful" proved successful in Europe, where it peaked within the top five of most markets in which it was released. Spending a total of 51 weeks on the UK Singles Chart, the song eventually peaked atop the chart becoming Aguilera's fourth UK number one; it was certified silver by the British Phonographic Industry. It peaked at numbers three and 18 on the Belgian Ultratop 50 and Ultratop 40, respectively. In Germany, the song peaked at number four after charting for thirteen weeks on the Media Control Charts. However, "Beautiful" proved less successful on the French Syndicat National de l'Édition Phonographique, where it reached number 27. The song was a success in Australia, peaking at number one on the ARIA Charts, where it spent a total of 13 weeks. "Beautiful" was later certified platinum by the Australian Recording Industry Association (ARIA) for shipments of 70,000 units. The song also charted on the New Zealand Top 40 Singles Chart for 23 weeks, during which period it peaked at number one.

In 2011, Aguilera performed the song alongside her finalist Beverly McClellan on the first-season finale of The Voice. The following week, it debuted at number 74 on the US Billboard Hot 100 and peaked at number 52 on the Hot Digital Songs diagram with first-week sales of 42,000 downloads on the iTunes Store.

Music videos

The accompanying music video for "Beautiful" was directed by Jonas Åkerlund and premiered on December 9, 2002. It opens with Aguilera speaking the line "Don't look at me", followed by scenes of her singing alone in a room intercut with self-image-related sequences of other people. An anorexic girl examines herself in a mirror, eventually punching through it; a thin teenage boy stands lifting weights in a room plastered with images of bodybuilders; and an African-American girl rips out pages of women's magazines including photos of only white women and throws them into a fire. In one sequence, a girl is physically bullied by several peers, and in another, a goth man sits at the back of a bus while several people get up and move. The video also touches on LGBT issues; one scene features a gay couple, portrayed by Jordan Shannon and Justin Croft, kissing on a bench and ignoring the stares of people who pass them. Another shows a transgender woman, played by Robert Sherman, putting on makeup, a wig, and women's clothing. The music video debuted at number 2 on Total Request Live, spending a total of 50 days on the chart and retiring at number 6. It topped MuchMusic's Countdown for two consecutive weeks and remained on the countdown for 15 weeks.

The video was positively reviewed by music critics, and received a Special Recognition award, presented by David LaChapelle, from the Gay & Lesbian Alliance Against Defamation at its 14th GLAAD Media Awards. After an a cappella performance of the song, Aguilera stated in her acceptance speech that "this song is definitely a universal message that everybody can relate to – anyone that's been discriminated against or unaccepted, unappreciated or disrespected just because of who you are. It was so important to me that I support the gay community in this sense." Billboard included "Beautiful" on its list of the greatest music videos of the 21st century, and Gail Mitchell wrote that it "eloquently touches on insecurity". Gay journalist Larry Flick praised the video for its "stunning execution" and depiction of self-love, and noted that with its help the song "became a perfect slice of cinematic empowerment".

On October 21, 2022, Aguilera released a new music video for the song, which depicts kids and teens grappling with the onslaught of negative messaging on social media, body dysmorphia, plastic surgery, depression, and suicidal ideation. CelebMix called the message behind the video "powerful", noting that it "highlights the impact of popular culture and social media on young people". Aguilera was given the Cybersmiler of the Month Award after the video was released.

Live performances

Recognized as one of her signature songs, Aguilera has performed "Beautiful" at a number of venues and events. During the promotion of Stripped, she appeared on VH1's Big In Awards, Top of the Pops, and the 46th Annual Grammy Awards. The song was included on the setlists of The Stripped Tour, the Justified and Stripped Tour in 2003 and the Back to Basics Tour in 2006. "Beautiful" was also sung on the television special VH1 Storytellers in 2010. "Beautiful" has also been performed on charity events and fundraisings, such as CNN Heroes introduced by Anderson Cooper saying, "It's my pleasure to introduce a performer with unparalleled range and passion; her song is a reminder that out of great trials and tribulations we can all create something beautiful"; Justin Timberlake & Friends in 2010, and Hurricane Sandy: Coming Together in 2012.

In 2021, Aguilera sang "Beautiful" at the Verizon's "Big Concert for Small Business" Super Bowl afterparty, at her performance at the Hollywood Bowl with Gustavo Dudamel and the Los Angeles Philharmonic, as well as the 47th People's Choice Awards.

Legacy

"Beautiful" has been embraced by the LGBT community as an anthem. The Advocates Larry Flick believed the release of the song was "one of the most powerful moments of queer activism in 2003". On October 5, 2010, several hundred people gathered in front of the Massachusetts State House and sang "Beautiful" as a tribute to the teenagers who had committed suicide due to anti-gay bullying during the previous months. In March 2011, the Columbus Children's Choir and Columbus Gay Men's Chorus joined to perform the song as a contribution to the It Gets Better Project. UK LGBT rights charity Stonewall named "Beautiful" the most empowering song of the decade for lesbian, gay and bisexual people; media personality and Stonewall contributor Paul Gambaccini called the song "a major achievement that has inspired millions of young people around the world." The result is based on the choice from 1,007 readers. Aguilera commented of the song's reception from the LGBT community, "I cannot express in words how much the LGBT community means to me. On my darkest day their support lifts me up. I feel honored that some of my songs become anthems to them as well."

"Beautiful" inspired a subgenre of empowerment pop songs including Katy Perry's "Firework" (2010) and Lady Gaga's "Born This Way" (2011). The transgender character from its music video seemingly influenced the Denis O'Hare's Liz Taylor role in the horror television series American Horror Story: Hotel. In 2022, Billboard ranked the song the second on their list of "The 100 Greatest Songs of 2002". They noted that the "Grammy-winning empowerment anthem provides a stunningly detailed illustration of the search for one's inner beauty amid battling insecurities".

Formats and track listings

 US, Germany and France CD single
 "Beautiful" – 3:58
 "Dame lo que Yo Te Doy" – 3:46
 "Beautiful" (music video) – 3:59

 UK CD single
 "Beautiful" – 3:58
 "Dirrty" (MaUVe Remix) – 8:11
 "Beautiful" (music video) – 3:59

 Digital remix EP
 "Beautiful" (Peter Rauhofer Radio Mix) – 3:58
 "Beautiful" (Al B Rich Radio Mix) – 4:14
 "Beautiful" (Valentin Radio Mix) – 3:59
 "Beautiful" (Peter Rauhofer Short Club) – 7:3 
 "Beautiful" (Brother Brown Mishow) – 5:11
 "Beautiful" (Brother Brown Divine Mix) – 9:3
 "Beautiful" (Al B Rich Next Level Mix) – 8:36
 "Beautiful" (Peter Rauhofer Beautiful Theme) – 3:40
 "Beautiful" (Valentin Club Mix) – 5:56
 "Beautiful" (Peter Rauhofer Extended Club) – 10:33
 "Beautiful" (Brother Brown Dub) – 7:50

Credits and personnel
Credits are adapted from the "Beautiful" CD single liner notes.

Recording locations
 Mixed at The Enterprise Studios, Burbank, California
 Engineered at Mad Dog Studios, Burbank, California
 Additional recording at The Enterprise Studios, Burbank, California
 Mastered at Bernie Grundman Mastering

Personnel

 Writing, Composing, Producing – Linda Perry
 Mixing – Dave "Hard Drive" Pensado
 Assisted mixing – Ethan Willoughby
 Engineering – Linda Perry, David Guerrero
 Pro Tools engineering – Davy Vain
 Mastering – Brian "Big Bass" Gardner
 Editing – Mike Barnard

Musicians

 Vocals – Christina Aguilera
 Piano, Guitar, Bass – Linda Perry
 Keyboards – Damon Fox
 Drums – Brian MacLeod
 Strings – The Section Quartet
 Violin – Eric Gorfain
 Viola – Shanti Randall
 Cello – Richard Dodd
 Additional Strings and String Arrangement – Linda Perry

Charts

Weekly charts

Year-end charts

Certifications

Release history

See also
 List of number-one adult contemporary singles of 2003 (U.S.)
 List of number-one dance singles of 2003 (U.S.)
 List of Romanian Top 100 number ones of the 2000s

References

External links
 

2000s ballads
2002 songs
2002 singles
2003 singles
Christina Aguilera songs
Music videos directed by Jonas Åkerlund
Number-one singles in Australia
Irish Singles Chart number-one singles
Number-one singles in New Zealand
Number-one singles in Romania
Number-one singles in Scotland
UK Singles Chart number-one singles
Pop ballads
Songs written by Linda Perry
Canadian Singles Chart number-one singles
LGBT-related songs
RCA Records singles
Contemporary R&B ballads
Grammy Award for Best Female Pop Vocal Performance